Great Notley is a village to the south-west of Braintree, Essex in England. It has an approximate population of 7,845 and became an independent civil parish on 1 April 2000 as a result of The Great Notley Parish Council Order 2000.

Archeology
Excavations in Great Notley revealed the remains of Iron Age and Roman settlements with a series of enclosures overlaid with a Roman development on the site of the Skyline Business Park, where it is thought that there was a series of occupations on the site from the late Iron Age onwards, which included brewing, farming and the production of textiles.

Estates
Great Notley was designed as a suburban development, a self-sustainable garden village composed of three distinct hamlets linked via a spine road:
 Notley Green hamlet, to the south
 Oaklands Manor hamlet, centred on a new manor house
 Panners Farm hamlet, to the north

It was built mostly by Countryside Properties, and is cited as an example of Countryside's design philosophy of 'instant maturity' and 'instant community'.

The parish also includes the older estate of White Court, now in the centre of the village; a business park, 'Skyline120', and a  country park.

Amenities

Due to the size of Great Notley, there is little in the way of indoor entertainment facilities. Outdoor entertainment includes various playgrounds and the aforementioned country park (known as the 'Discovery Centre'), which includes outdoor play equipment, a café and water features.

There are various small businesses operating in Great Notley, including a veterinary centre, a public house (the Prince Louis), an estate agents and a tanning salon. There is also a Tesco supermarket located in the garden village, making it the third Tesco to be built within the Braintree district.

Schools
There are two schools in Great Notley; White Court Primary School and Notley Green Primary School, which was opened in 1999. The main secondary school for the area is Notley High School, which is located in the neighbouring village of Black Notley.

References

Villages in Essex
Braintree District